Workum is a railway station serving Workum, Netherlands. The station was opened on 28 November 1885. It is located on the Leeuwarden–Stavoren railway between Sneek and Stavoren. The train services are operated by Arriva.

Train services

Bus services

See also
 List of railway stations in Friesland

External links
NS website 
Dutch Public Transport journey planner 

Railway stations in Friesland
Railway stations opened in 1885